Pordenone Calcio, commonly referred to as Pordenone, is a professional football club based in Pordenone, Friuli-Venezia Giulia, Italy.

History
It was founded in 1920 as Football Club Pordenone.

In the 2007–08 season the club was promoted from Eccellenza Friuli – Venezia Giulia to Serie D, and six seasons later (in 2014) it was promoted to the new Lega Pro. The club was relegated in 2015 but re-admitted at the start of 2015–16 Lega Pro, to fill the vacancies.

The club reached the Lega Pro play-offs for two seasons in a row, being defeated in the semi-finals by Pisa and Parma, the clubs that eventually got promoted.

On 12 December 2017, in the Round of 16, Pordenone played Inter Milan for the Coppa Italia at the San Siro, drawing 0-0, and getting knocked out 5–4 in penalties. This is the farthest the team has ever reached in the competition.

Pordenone successively won the Group B title in the 2018–19 Serie C season under the tenure of seasoned manager Attilio Tesser, thus ensuring themselves the right to play Serie B for the first time in the club's history.

The club's first season in Serie B was largely successful, achieving a fourth-place finish in the league and thus reached the play-offs for promotion to Serie A. However, Pordenone's push for a second-consecutive promotion was ended with a 2-1 aggregate defeat in the semi-final against Frosinone. In the 2020-21 season, Pordenone suffered a downturn in fortunes as the club ended the campaign in 15th position in the table, with Tesser being removed from his position as coach in April 2021 and replaced by Maurizio Domizzi. In the 2021-22 season campaign the team finished dead last and was relegated to Serie C, after changing three head coaches.

Players

Current squad

Out on loan

Coaching Staff

Honours
Serie C
Champions: 2018–19 (group B)

Serie D
 Champions: 2013–14

 Supercoppa di Serie C
Winners: 2019

Colours and badge
The colours of the club are black and green, originated from the shirt of then Venezia. The away kit is usually predominantly white; during the years the secondary colors have been varying from green, red (evoking the same colors of the city of Pordenone banner) and black. The badge used to represent the city coat of arms, sometimes with a lizard; more recently the badge has been modernized with a logo representing the letters P and N, identifying the car plate of the province and three waves to depicting the river Noncello.

References

External links
 Officiale site

Football clubs in Italy
Football clubs in Friuli-Venezia Giulia
Association football clubs established in 1920
Serie B clubs
Serie C clubs
1920 establishments in Italy
Pordenone